An independence referendum was held in French Somaliland on 19 March 1967. It was ordered by then President of France, General Charles de Gaulle, in response to rioting and demonstrations upon an official visit he made to the territory the year before. Voters rejected independence from France by a 22-point margin.

It was the second of three independence referendums. In the first referendum, the 1958 French Somaliland constitutional referendum, voters rejected independence by a 50-point margin. In the third referendum, the 1977 Afars and Issas independence referendum, voters near-unanimously backed independence.

Conduct
As with the previous referendum of 1958, the vote was marred by reports of vote rigging on the part of the French authorities, with some 10,000 Somalis deported under the pretext that they did not have valid identity cards. According to official figures, although the territory was at the time inhabited by 58,240 Somali and 48,270 Afar, only 14,689 Somali were allowed to register to vote versus 22,004 Afar. Somali representatives also claimed that the French had simultaneously imported thousands of Afar nomads from neighboring Ethiopia to further tip the odds in their favor. The French authorities denied this, suggesting that Afars already greatly outnumbered Somalis on the voting lists.

Results
Initial results supported a continued but looser relationship with France, with 60.6% of the electorate voting for the status quo on a 95% turnout. Voting was also divided along ethnic lines, with the resident Somalis by and large voting for independence, with the goal of eventual reunion with Somalia, and the Afars generally opting to remain associated with France.

Aftermath
The announcement of  results led to civil unrest and several deaths. The French government increased its military force along the frontier.

References

French S
Referendums in Djibouti
Independence referendums
Djibouti
French Somaliland
March 1967 events in Africa